Power and Education is a triannual peer-reviewed academic journal covering educational practice and research. It was established in 2009 and is published by SAGE Publishing. The editor-in-chief is Dean Garrett (York St John University).

Abstracts and indexing
The journal is abstracted and indexed in:

References

External links

Education journals
SAGE Publishing academic journals
Triannual journals
English-language journals
Publications established in 2009